Terrebonne County is a historical county in the Laurentides region of Quebec, Canada. Its county seat and main city was Saint-Jérôme.  

In the early 1980s Quebec's counties were abolished and replaced by regional county municipalities.

External links

Former counties of Quebec
Populated places disestablished in 1983